The Central Bank of the Democratic People's Republic of Korea is North Korea's central bank. Established on December 6, 1947, it issues the North Korean wŏn. The Bank is subordinated to the Cabinet of North Korea. Since 2021, the president of the bank is Chae Song-hak. He was preceded by Kim Chon-gyun since 2014.

History
On February 15, 1946, a central bank of North Korea was announced, which was to be under the control of the Soviet military. However, the bank failed to accomplish its objectives, being unable to meet its costs of operation, and the 100 million wŏn capitalisation was ineffective. The North Korean Interim People's Committee did not look upon the bank favorably, and chose instead to work through the Farmers' Bank, which also existed at the time. By late 1946, banking functions were consolidated into two main institutions, the Central Bank and Farmer's Bank. In June 1947, around 1,000 million wŏn was concentrated in the Central Bank, allowing it to extend credits totalling 900 million wŏn for economic rehabilitation. The consolidation reflected a return to the original objectives of the People's Committee, which wanted closer control over the economy; any banking people opposed to the changes within the system were removed from their posts. On December 6, 1947, a comprehensive program of currency reform was announced.

In 1959, the Central and Farmers' banks were merged to form the Central Bank of the Democratic People's Republic of Korea. The Foreign Trade Bank was established to handle the Central Bank's international business.

The Central Bank has over 220 branches. It operates the Chŏnsŏng electronic cash card.

Presidents

See also
Ministry of Finance (North Korea)
List of banks in North Korea

References

Further reading
 

Banks of North Korea
Korea, North
1947 establishments in Korea
Banks established in 1947
Cabinet of North Korea